A Tale of Two Kitchens is a 2019 short documentary film directed by Trisha Ziff. The film explores how Mexico City restaurant owner Gabriela Cámara opens sister eatery Cala in San Francisco, with a similar menu and, most importantly, a similar employee culture.

The documentary was released on Netflix on May 22, 2019.

References

External links
 
 

2019 short documentary films
2019 films
Netflix original documentary films